Zağalı (also, Zagaly) is a village and municipality in the Dashkasan Rayon of Azerbaijan.  It has a population of 401.

References 

Populated places in Dashkasan District